Johannes Petri may refer to:

 Johannes Petri (printer) (1441–1511), printer in Basel
 Johannes Petreius (1497–1550), printer in Basel

See also
 Schwabe (publisher), founded by Johannes Petri (1441–1511)